Cedar Run may refer to the following:

Cedar Run (Missouri), a tributary of the Big River
Cedar Run, Pennsylvania, an unincorporated community in Lycoming County
Cedar Run (Pennsylvania), a tributary of Pine Creek
Cedar Run (Occoquan River), in Virginia, a tributary of the Occoquan River
Cedar Run, New Jersey, an unincorporated community in Ocean County
Cedar Run, Michigan, a ghost town in Grand Traverse County

See also